Luc Anatole Jacques Garnier (December 21, 1928 - May 1, 1999) was fourth bishop of the Episcopal Diocese of Haiti between 1971 and 1994.

Biography
Garnier was born on December 21, 1928 in Maïssade, Haiti. He attended the theological school in Haiti and graduated in 1956. That same year, in April, he was ordained deacon and that same November he was ordained priest by Bishop C. Alfred Voegeli. He became priest-in-charge of Gros Morne and Gonaïves.Then, in 1961 he was appointed rector of the Church of the Epiphany in Port-au-Prince while a year later he became the Dean of Trinity Cathedral. In the absence of a bishop, after C. Alfred Voegeli was deported from Haiti, Garnier was appointed as administrator of the diocese in 1969. He was elected to succeed Voegeli and was consecrated on April 20, 1971 by Presiding Bishop John E. Hines in Trinity Cathedral, the first native to serve the post. He retired in 1994 and died on May 1, 1999 in Port-au-Prince.

References 
Obituary -- Luc Anatole Jacques Garnier
Episcopal Church website

1928 births
1999 deaths
People from Centre (department)
Haitian Anglicans
20th-century American Episcopalians
Episcopal bishops of Haiti
Haitian Christian clergy
20th-century American clergy